The University Hospital Center of Treichville is a hospital in Abidjan, Ivory Coast. The facility was built in 1938 to be an annex hospital of the nearby Plateau Central Hospital. In 1976 the facility acquired the status of university hospital center (CHU). The hospital is built on a space of 42 hectares and has a capacity of 658 beds.

The hospital is responsible for providing emergency care, diagnostic tests, consultations and treatment of patients. It also offers possibilities of hospitalization for the sick. 

Various initiatives for the development of preventive medicine actions are also targeted by this training which not only participates in Abidjan with Cocody and Yopougon university hospitals in postgraduate medical education but also in pharmaceutical, dental/dental education and paramedic. The CHU Treichville remains in addition, a center for medical, pharmaceutical and dental research.

However, the facility faces very serious health problems, insalubrity, and lack of means and maintenance of equipment and the premises. The CHU suffers from a lack of medical staff and a largely insufficient budget.

References 

Medical and health organizations based in Ivory Coast
1938 establishments in French West Africa